The Crew is an American comedy streaming television series created by Jeff Lowell for Netflix that premiered on February 15, 2021. The series stars Kevin James as the crew chief of a NASCAR garage. In July 2021, the series was canceled after one season.

Premise
The series takes place in a NASCAR garage where the crew chief butts heads with his new boss and "tech-reliant millennial" staff when his owner decided to retire and let his Stanford-educated daughter take over the racing team.

Cast and characters

Main

 Kevin James as Kevin Gibson, the crew chief of Bobby Spencer Racing
 Jillian Mueller as Catherine Spencer, the new CEO of Bobby Spencer Racing and Bobby Spencer's daughter
 Freddie Stroma as Jake Martin, the driver of Bobby Spencer Racing
 Gary Anthony Williams as Chuck Stubbs, the car chief of Bobby Spencer Racing
 Dan Ahdoot as Amir Lajani, the chief engineer of Bobby Spencer Racing
 Sarah Stiles as Beth Paige, the office manager of Bobby Spencer Racing

Recurring

 Bruce McGill as Bobby Spencer, the owner and the old CEO of the racing team
 Paris Berelc as Jessie De La Cruz, a young racing driver that Catherine is considering hiring to replace Jake
 Mather Zickel as Frank, Beth's boyfriend who is a financial analyst at Kinnane Brothers

Guest starring
 Kim Coates as Rob, the racing team's biggest sponsor
 Ryan Blaney as Himself
 Austin Dillon as Himself
 Jamie Little as Herself  	
 Cole Custer as Himself
 Lesli Margherita as Morgan Conrad, the owner of Fake Steak and Kevin's love interest

Episodes

Production

Development
On September 4, 2019, Netflix gave the production a series order. The series is created by Jeff Lowell who also executive produced alongside Kevin James, Jeff Sussman, Todd Garner, Matt Summers and Tim Clark. On July 2, 2021, Netflix canceled the series after one season.

Casting
Upon series order announcement, Kevin James was also cast to star in the series. On December 17, 2019, Gary Anthony Williams, Dan Ahdoot, Freddie Stroma, Sarah Stiles, and Jillian Mueller joined the cast as series regulars. On January 30, 2020, Mather Zickel was cast in a recurring role. On January 15, 2021, it was reported that Paris Berelc and Bruce McGill were cast in recurring capacities.

Filming
The Crew  was filmed at Gold Coast Studios in Bethpage, New York, but it is set in Charlotte, North Carolina.

Release
The series was released on Netflix on February 15, 2021.

Reception

On Rotten Tomatoes, the series holds an approval rating of 40% based on 10 critic reviews, with an average rating of 4.7/10. Metacritic gave the series a weighted average score of 44 out of 100 based on 4 critics, indicating "mixed or average reviews".

References

External links
 
 

2020s American workplace comedy television series
2021 American television series debuts
2021 American television series endings
American sports television series
English-language Netflix original programming
NASCAR on television
Television shows directed by Andy Fickman
Television shows filmed in New York (state)
Television shows set in North Carolina